George Sallis (born 8 October 1971 in London, England) is an artistic director, theatre producer and actor.  He was chairman of the Lion and Unicorn Theatre in Kentish Town, London.

He is the founder and artistic director of the Giant Olive Theatre Company, which was the resident company at the Lion and Unicorn Theatre, 2008-2015.

Works include, 'A Christmas Carol' 2008  and 'Oliver Twist' 2009, 'POP8', 2009, conceived and choreographed by Antonia Franceschi.(Fame, New York City Ballet). 'ZIP: Gun & Knife Crime' 2010  and The GOlive Dance and Performance festival.

Productions
2015 JUST DANCE UK Premiere. Produced by AFD/Giant Olive, Theatre Royal Winchester, Choreography by Antonia Franceschi. Dancers: Royal Ballet, Rambert, Ballet Black and Random Dance 
2015 GOlive Dance and Performance Festival Oxford curated by Donald Hutera
2015 GOlive Dance and Performance Festival London curated by Donald Hutera
2014 GOlive GOlab curated by Donald Hutera
2014 GOlive Extended curated by Donald Hutera 
2013 GOlive Dance and Performance Festival curated by Donald Hutera 
2011     I'LL SHOW YOU MINE, Adapted and Performed by Caroline Horton, Produced by Giant Olive Theatre Company
2011     BEAUTY IS PRISON-TIME, Written and Performed by Zoe Mavroudi,
2011     TOM JONES, Henry Fielding, Directed by Edward Kingham,
2011     GO GALA, George Sallis (GO Artistic Director), Antonia Franceschi (GO Artistic Advisor), Mark Baldwin (Artistic Director, Rambert), Richard Alston (Artistic Director, The Place), Martin Lawrence (Choreographer) 
2010-11  A CHRISTMAS CAROL, Charles Dickens
2010     ZIP:Gun & Knife Crime, Produced by George Sallis.
2009-10  OLIVER TWIST, Charles Dickens, Adapted by Piers Beckley, Directed by Ray Shell
2009-10  SUPERNATURAL, Written by Aline Waites and Jago Turner, Directed by Mykal Rand
2009     KITTY AND DAMNATION, Written by Joseph Crilly
2009     POP8 with Antonia Franceschi, Zoë Martlew and Ballet Black
2008-09  A CHRISTMAS CAROL, Charles Dickens, Adapted by Piers Beckley
2008     THE HOSTESS OF THE INN, Carlo Goldoni, Translated & adapted by Katherine Gregor, Directed by Alex Hunter
2008     ANTIGONE, Sophocles
2008     ADULT ORGASM, Dario Fo and Franka Rame
2008     THE WOULD BE GENTLEMAN, Molière, Directed by Alex Hunter

References

External links 
 Company Website

1971 births
Living people
English theatre managers and producers
Artistic directors
Businesspeople from London
Male actors from London